Kulm is a German language toponym derived from the Latin culmen, meaning hill, and may refer to:

Places

Austria
 Kulm bei Weiz, a municipality in Styria
 Kulm am Zirbitz, a municipality in Styria
 Kulm (ski flying venue), a ski jumping site at Tauplitz, Salzkammergut

Bohemia, now Czech Republic
 The German name of Chlumec (Český Krumlov District) in Bohemia, the scene of:
 Battle of Kulm, 1813 defeat to Napoleon by Austrians, Prussians, and Russians
 The German name of Chlumec (Ústí nad Labem District) in Bohemia

Germany
 Rauher Kulm, a mountain near Kemnath, Upper Palatinate
 Kulmbach, a stream and town in Bavarian district of  Upper Franconia
 Kulm (Saalfeld), a hill near Saalfeld

Iran
 Kulm-e-Bala, a village in Ilam Province
 Kulm-e-Pain, a village in Ilam Province

Prussia, now Poland
 Culm/Kulm town in Prussia, now Chełmno
Kulm law, a Prussian Law (type of town charter)
Kulmerland, an historic region and diocese in Prussia

Switzerland
 Harderkulm, a viewpoint on the Harder near Interlaken in canton of Bern
 Kulm (district) in canton of Aargau
 Kulm, a hamlet next to the Simplon Pass, canton of Valais
 Oberkulm and Unterkulm, two related villages in the canton of Aargau
 Pilatus Kulm, the name of the top cable car station on the Pilatus near Luzern
 Rigi Kulm, the highest peak of the Rigi massif, canton of Schwyz, near Luzern
 Kulm Hotel (disambiguation)

United States
 Kulm, North Dakota

See also
Culm (disambiguation)